Du‘ā' Karāwī is a Nizari Isma'ili ceremony during which the Ismaili ask God for his forgiveness through the "Imam of the Time". The Qur'an states that the Muslims must repent of their sins; it further stipulates that the believer (mu'mins) must approach the presence of Muhammad and seek forgiveness, and that the Muhammad must also seek forgiveness on their behalf. This is expressed in several Qur'anic verses including the following:

References

Shia prayers
Ismaili practices
Salah terminology
Nizari Ismailism